Live at the Sex Machine is the first live album released by the funk band Kool and the Gang. The album was released in 1971, and reached #6 on the Billboard R&B Albums chart. Not only was it a Top 10 album, it stayed on the chart for 33 weeks; an impressive time span compared to most albums of the era. Although the band's huge success would not come until a few albums later, this release was popular with the R&B market. Like most of their early catalog, it was sampled by several artists during Hip-Hop's "Golden Era" of the 1980s and early 1990s. The track "Funky Man" was sampled in "Smack My Bitch Up" by The Prodigy.

Track listing

References

External links
 

Kool & the Gang albums
1971 live albums
De-Lite Records live albums